Alfred "Ralph" Winsor (January 8, 1880 – September 12, 1961) was an American ice hockey coach and amateur ice hockey player. Winsor coached ice hockey at Harvard University between 1903 and 1917.

Biography

Alfred Winsor was born in Brookline, Massachusetts, on January 8, 1880, to Alfred Winsor, Sr. and Linda Kennard. Winsor attended Harvard University from where he graduated in 1902. Prior to that he had attended Noble and Greenough's School in Boston.

Winsor played ice hockey at Harvard, at the forward position, between 1900 and 1902 and was captain of the 1902 team that played in the intercollegiate league series against teams from Yale, Princeton, Brown and Columbia. Winsor led his team with 11 goals in six intercollegiate games in 1902 when Harvard finished in second place behind the team from Yale University.

In 1903, at an age of 23, Alfred Winsor took over the coaching duties of the Harvard University hockey team, and he became an instant success when the team won the 1903 intercollegiate series. Winsor became a mainstay as a coach for the Harvard team for 14 years, until 1917, and implemented a rigid defensive system that other teams felt a need to copy to match up against the crimson colored Harvard team.

Concurrently with his coaching career Winsor also continued to play amateur hockey, between 1903 and 1911 on the Boston Hockey Club and in 1912 with the Boston Athletic Association.

In 1932 Winsor coached the American hockey team at the Winter Olympics in Lake Placid where the American team finished with silver medals.

Alfred Winsor died on September 12, 1961, in Cataumet, Massachusetts, at an age of 81. In 1973 he was inducted into the United States Hockey Hall of Fame.

Head coaching record

References

 Society for International Hockey Research at sihrhockey.org

Notes

1880 births
1961 deaths
American ice hockey coaches
Ice hockey coaches from Massachusetts
Harvard Crimson men's ice hockey coaches
Harvard Crimson men's ice hockey players
American men's ice hockey forwards
Ice hockey players from Massachusetts
Boston Athletic Association ice hockey players